Kasha-Katuwe Tent Rocks National Monument is a U.S. National Monument located approximately  southwest of Santa Fe, New Mexico, near Cochiti Pueblo. Managed by the Bureau of Land Management (BLM), it was established as a U.S. National Monument by President Bill Clinton in January 2001. Kasha-Katuwe means "white cliffs" in the Pueblo language Keresan. The monument is a unit of the BLM's National Conservation Lands.

Geology
Kasha-Katuwe is located on the Pajarito Plateau between 5700 and 6400 feet (1737–1951 m) above sea level. The area owes its remarkable geology to layers of volcanic rock and ash deposited by pyroclastic flow from eruptions within the volcanic field of the Jemez Mountains that occurred 6 to 7 million years ago. These rock layers are assigned to the Peralta Tuff. Many of the layers are light in color, which is the origin of the monument's Keresan name. Over time, weathering and erosion of these layers has created slot canyons and tent rocks. The tent rocks are composed of soft pumice and tuff. Most of the tent rocks have a distinctly conical shape and some retain their caprocks of harder stone.

Recreational activities
The BLM maintains hiking trails as well as parking and restrooms at the site. The Veterans' Memorial Scenic Overlook, dedicated in 2004, includes a  loop trail and views of Peralta Canyon and the Jemez Mountains.

The monument is open for day use only and may be closed by order of the Cochiti Pueblo Tribal Governor. Considerations for hiking include the possibility of flash flooding in the slot canyons and the high altitude of the monument. The monument is closed to dogs.

In popular culture
The science fiction television series Earth 2 filmed scenes at the monument.

Closure
The BLM closed the monument in 2020 due to the Covid-19 pandemic. The monument has not reopened as of the end on 2022 due to continued concerns of Covid-19 transmission to the Cochiti Pueblo and to addresses concerns of over-visitation, long wait times, staffing needs, and resource protection.

Gallery

See also
 List of national monuments of the United States
 Ah-Shi-Sle-Pah Wilderness Study Area
 Bisti/De-Na-Zin Wilderness
 Bryce Canyon National Park
 Đavolja Varoš
 Demoiselles Coiffées de Pontis
 Hoodoo (geology)
 List of rock formations
 Wilderness Act

References

External links

 U.S. Bureau of Land Management webpage for Kasha-Katuwe Tent Rocks National Monument
 The Conservation System Alliance
 Geologic Tour for Kasha-Katuwe Tent Rocks National Monument, New Mexico Bureau of Geology & Mineral Resources
 More Hiking Information for Kasha-Katuwe Tent Rocks National Monument
 History and Driving Suggestions for Kasha-Katuwe Tent Rocks National Monument
 Kasha-Katuwe Tent Rocks National Monument on TripAdvisor

National Monuments in New Mexico
Bureau of Land Management National Monuments
Bureau of Land Management areas in New Mexico
Jemez Mountains
Rock formations of New Mexico
Landforms of Sandoval County, New Mexico
Protected areas of Sandoval County, New Mexico
2001 establishments in New Mexico
Protected areas established in 2001
Units of the National Landscape Conservation System